Cassilis may refer to:

Cassilis, New Brunswick, a rural community in Northumberland County, New Brunswick, Canada
Cassilis, New South Wales, a town in central-western New South Wales, Australia
Cassilis, Victoria, a town in Gippsland, Victoria, Australia

See also
Cassils (disambiguation)
Earl of Cassilis, Scottish title (1509-1831, now Marquess of Ailsa)